John Bristow (25 April 1701 – 14 November 1768), of Mark Lane, London, and Quidenham, Norfolk, was an English merchant, financier and politician who sat in the House of Commons from 1734 to 1768.

Early life
Bristow was the third surviving son of Robert Bristow (1662–1706), MP of Micheldever, Hampshire, and his wife Katherine Woolley, daughter of Robert Woolley, vintner, of London. He became a leading merchant in trade with Portugal, and a prominent figure in the South Sea Company, of which he was a director from 1730 and then deputy governor from 1733. In 1733, he married Anne Judith Foisin, the daughter of Paul Foisin, an East India merchant in Paris.

Career
 Bristow was returned by his brother-in-law, John Hobart, 1st Earl of Buckinghamshire, as Member of Parliament (MP) for Bere Alston at the 1734 British general election. He voted consistently with the Government.  In 1739, on the outbreak of war with Spain,  he and his partner Peter Burrell, were granted contracts for remitting money for the forces in Gibraltar, Minorca and Jamaica. The Jamaica contract was on very favourable terms and allegations arose that  Walpole had made a bad bargain for the public. At the 1741 British general election he was returned as MP for St Ives. After the fall of Walpole in 1742, a secret committee was set up by the Commons to inquire into the Jamaica contract and endorsed the charges against him, but no action was taken. Bristow helped finance the continental war and, in 1744, was among the underwriters of a government loan, with a share £150,000. In 1744 he was also appointed a trustee for a loan of £200,000 to the King of Sardinia. In 1744, he was involved in raising supplies for the war. He was returned as MP for St Ives again at the 1747 British general election. In 1753 he was a financier who lent Danzig £90,000.

At the 1754 British general election, Bristow was returned as MP for Bere Alston again. He suffered great losses in the Lisbon Earthquake of 1755, which led to financial difficulties for him from then on. In November he and his partners were asked by the Treasury  to procure provisions  for Portugal, and in December Bristow and Burrell were appointed to provide money for the relief of those distressed in Portugal, and were to be paid £100,000 to cover costs. He became sub-governor of the South Sea Company in 1756.  At the 1761 British general election, he was returned as MP for Arundel on the government interest. By this time he was owing the government considerable sums, but argued that his estate in Norfolk would provide more than enough to cover the amount, and he was owed large sums in Portugal. He went to Portugal and probably stayed there as he was absent for much of the parliament.  He did not stand at the 1768 British general election.

Death and legacy
Bristow died in Portugal on 14 November 1768 leaving four sons and eleven daughters. He was buried in Lisbon's British Cemetery. His daughter Caroline married William Henry Lyttleton, MP. His daughter, Frances, married Richard Neave later Governor of the Bank of England. Another daughter, Harriot Elizabeth Slessor, who married an army officer stationed in Portugal, is an ancestor of actress Olivia Colman.

Bristow had acquired Quidenham Hall after 1740 and added an East Wing in Palladian style and a West portico supported by large Doric columns. 
     
Bristow's brother Robert Bristow (1688–1737) and his nephew Robert Bristow (1712–1776) were both MPs for Winchelsea, which had been his father's seat.

References 

1701 births
1768 deaths
Members of the Parliament of Great Britain for Bere Alston
Members of the Parliament of Great Britain for constituencies in Cornwall
British MPs 1734–1741
British MPs 1741–1747
British MPs 1747–1754
British MPs 1754–1761
British MPs 1761–1768
English businesspeople
Burials at the British Cemetery, Lisbon